Jagdish Sheth School of Management (formerly 'IFIM Business School') is a business school in Bangalore, India. It was founded in 1995 and is located in Bangalore, popularly known as the Silicon Valley of India. The institute is located in Electronic City, one of India's largest industrial parks.

Jagdish Sheth School of Management is promoted by the Dalal Street Investment Journal Group and is an AICTE approved institution with an ISO 9001:2008 certification. JAGSOM is accredited by Association to Advance Collegiate Schools of Business (AACSB). JAGSOM was the 6th B Schools in India to earn the AACSB accreditation. JAGSOM is also SAQS (South Asian Quality Assurance System) accredited, an accreditation conferred by The Association of Management Development Institutions in South Asia (AMDISA). The most recent work of the Jagdish Sheth School of Management was a study that it conducted in partnership with the National HRD Network (NHRDN), to discover the needs of Industry 4.0 and curate a curriculum aligned to that. The study report that was unveiled on January 8, 2019 in Bangalore at the hands of Dr Tom R. Robinson, President and CEO – AACSB, Dr Jagdish Sheth, Professor – Goizueta Business School, Emory University and Dr A. Parasuraman, Professor and Chair in Marketing – University of Miami Business School has drawn widespread appreciation from both industry and academia. It is on account of this study that AACSB has invited Jagdish Sheth School of Management to present at the ICAM 2019, making it a one-of-its-kind representation by any Indian management institute in the history of ICAM.

Sheth School of Management's Marketing & Finance master's programs have been ranked globally top 51+ and 101+ respectively, by QS World University Rankings.

History
The Jagdish Sheth School of Management (formerly 'IFIM Business School')was established in 1995 by the Center for Developmental Education (CDE), a not for profit society registered under the Karnataka Society Registration Act. This institute was established to develop finance and management professionals for the financial services industry of India which was growing at a rapid pace post liberalization in the country. The institute's diploma offering was recognized by AICTE from the day of its inception. The institute grew to be a fully fledged Business School by 2004 and was renamed as the IFIM Business School.

Accreditation

Approved

JAGSOM is an AICTE approved institute which is also ISO 9001:2008 certified. JAGSOM's programs have also been approved by the Distance Education Bureau, a department of the University Grants Commission (UGC) to offer its programs in distance mode. The PGDM Finance is recognised by the CFA Institute under its University Recognition Program.

JAGSOM is accredited by SAQS (South Asian Quality Assurance System) accreditation, a certification conferred by The Association of Management Development Institutions in South Asia (AMDISA). JAGSOM is accredited by Association to Advance Collegiate Schools of Business (AACSB). Three of the business schools with AACSB accreditation from India, namely JAGSOM Bangalore, IIM Udaipur and ISB are in existence for less than twenty-five years

International Collaborations
JAGSOM maintains collaborations with ESC Rennes School of Business, University of Applied Sciences, Lübeck, Virginia Commonwealth University, Manchester Metropolitan University, University of Milano-Bicocca, Nanyang Technological University, University of Wollongong and Plymouth University. JAGSOM to offer super-specializations in the new age areas where technology is disrupting the business world. To achieve the same JAGSOM Shall collaborate with McCombs School of Business at the University of Texas at Austin for Big Data Analytics and Blockchain, Darden School of Business at the University of Virginia for MarTech, Virginia Commonwealth University (VCU) School of Business for Financial Analysis and Technology and ESCP London for Digital Transformation and Robotic Process Automation

Campus

JAGSOM's institutional campus has over 110,000 square feet of constructed space spread over 1.5 acres of land in Electronic City in Bangalore. JAGSOM's residential campus has co-ed student residences spread across a 2.20 acre campus which is located about 2 km from the institutional campus behind Electronics City. The campus has air-conditioned auditorium and Knowledge Centers consisting of modern Library and Computer Centers.

Library
The 3,000 ft² library on campus holds 11080 relevant books, 381 bound volumes, 400 A/V resources, 118 journals (Print), 5000+ E-journals, 18000+ E-dissertation, 4500 E-annual reports, and 11 newspapers. The library subscribes to over 80 journals or periodicals, and has an extensive collection of reports and projects. Faculty and students can access the online journals – current as well as retrospective – through the electronic database.

Use of Technology
JAGSOM has been recognised for implementing technology in streamlining the institution's processes. It has also been awarded to use technology's efficiency in enhancing educational and extracurricular activities. JAGSOM has deployed multiple applications to cater for various activities across the campus. The institution has received a recognition in Microsoft's case study on technological implementation.

JAGSOM has developed the Keep Learning Platform, an umbrella under which all the various platforms that the institution uses, been assimilated. The applications that the B-school now uses include CampusLabs ERP for administration requirements, D2L Brightspace for academic delivery, @Workplace for social, and Office 365 for collaboration.

IBM Business Analytics Laboratory

IBM and JAGSOM have collaborated to help students in areas of managerial decision-making and strategy. This program, initiated by Career Education for Business Transformation (CEBT), focuses on the major areas of business transformation where software plays a critical role.

IBM Business Analytics Lab has been set within the JAGSOM campus, where IBM will provide relevant software for CEBT training, to address the increasing need for T-Shaped skills in the global marketplace. The program brings together the latest software content, real-world industry experiences, hands-on lab course, best practices and case studies into a single education program. Completion of the track is marked by a certificate from IBM.

Prabhudas Lilladher Finance Lab
Prabhudas Lilladher Finance Lab aims to serve as a host of practical knowledge and real-world examples to complement the ‘in class’ theoretical learning experience, thereby helping students gain a wider acceptance in the financial world. The lab is a central place for students to learn tools and techniques used in the industry such as: trading terminals, statistical packages (R or SAS), Analytical tools – Factset, Technical Analysis – Metastock or F-Charts etc. It was started in collaboration with Prabhudas Lilladher, one of the largest brokerage firms in India.

Centre for Research (CFR)

CFR encourages faculty members, in association with students, to take on research work in the field of management. It facilitates research activities (both theoretical and empirical) that are relevant to the industry and management studies in general.

Centre for Entrepreneurship (CFE)
CFE incubates and facilitates enterprising activities (sessions and engagement) for potential entrepreneurs. It provides a platform for successful entrepreneurs to share their success stories with the budding aspirants and develops the content, case studies, and research pertaining to entrepreneurship.

Centre of Excellence in Banking (CEB)
Centre of Excellence in Banking was established to undertake teaching, training & extension in the field of law and regulation governing banking.

Centre for Continuous Employability (CCE)
CCE facilitates alignment of academic curriculum to the industry needs.

V. B. Padode Centre for Sustainability

JAGSOM has set up V. B. Padode Center for Sustainability in collaboration with Infosys. The Sustainability Center aims to develop a holistic, practical and creative approach to education and sensitize managers towards social issues.

Academic programs
JAGSOM offers the following programs:

Post Graduate Diploma in Management (PGDM)
The Post Graduate Diploma in Management at JAGSOM is a two-year full-time program. It is approved by the All India Council for Technical Education (AICTE). The program offers specialization in Finance, Marketing, HR, Operations or Strategy. The course includes a 4.5 months Industry Internship Program (IIP) after completion of fifth semester. The intake for the program is 300.

Post Graduate Diploma in Management – Finance (PGDM – Finance)
The Post Graduate Diploma in Management – Finance at JAGSOM is a two-year full-time program. It is approved by the All India Council for Technical Education (AICTE). Additionally, this course is approved by the CFA (Chartered Financial Analyst) Institute, USA University Recognition Program.

Post Graduate Diploma in Management – International Business (PGDM – International Business)
A two-year full-time program with an option of term-abroad with international partner B-Schools to facilitate student/faculty exchanges, collaborative research and consultancy assignments, and joint degree programs.

Executive Education

PGDM for Working Professionals
PGDM is a 24-month PGDM program for working executives. It is designed for people from junior & middle management, with 2–6 years of executive work experience.

PGDM-Work Integrated Learning Program (WILP)
WILP is a 24-month PGDM program in which a corporate internship is integrated into the curriculum and forms an integral part of academic learning. The program offers students an opportunity to pursue their studies while they intern with a company and earn a stipend. JAGSOM facilitates the internship with leading corporate partners.

PG Certificate in Global Financial Markets
The PGCP-GFM is an 11-month, full-time program divided into 4 quadmesters with 900 hours of intensive training and an immersion in Singapore.

Events

Naman
Naman is an annual management and cultural festival organized by students of JAGSOM. It is a national level event which sees participation from b-schools across India.

Convergence
Convergence is a platform to bring educationists and practicing communities of different areas together in order to exchange opinions on a given theme. 
The Startup Convergence’ is a two-day catalytic event aimed at bringing together people from various verticals of the startup ecosystem to deliberate on issues related to entrepreneurship.

Kanyathon

JAGSOM, in association with S.A.F.E. (Students Against Female Exploitation), an organization formed by the students of JAGSOM, conduct walkathon every year. The cause of the walkathon is 'Save the Girl Child'. In 2013 some 400 people from different walks of life participated.

Clubs, societies, and interest groups
 Student Council
 Toastmasters Club
 PlaceCom – Placement Committee
 V4U – HR Club
 Quizbizz – Quiz Club
 Marketing Club
 Alpha – Finance Club
 MRC – Media Relations Club
 ARC – Alumni Relations Committee
 CSR – Corporate Social Responsibility

References

External links

 aicte-india.org (PDF)

Business schools in Bangalore